George James Augustine (born 1955) is an American neuroscientist known for his work on presynaptic mechanisms of neurotransmitter release and his contributions to the development of optogenetics, a tool to control neural activity using light. He is best known as the author of the popular neuroscience textbook published by Oxford University Press along with lead author Dale Purves.

He was previously the G.B. Geller Professor of Neurobiology at Duke University, US. He is currently Irene Tan Liang Kheng Chair Professor in Neuroscience at the Lee Kong Chian School of Medicine, Nanyang Technological University.

Academic background 
Augustine obtained his doctorate from the University of Maryland, Baltimore, and trained under Roger Eckert at University of California, Los Angeles, and Erwin Neher at Max Planck Institute for Biophysical Chemistry. He was an early receipt of the Grass Fellowship from the Marine Biological Laboratory and has held faculty positions at the University of Southern California, Duke University, and the Duke–NUS Medical School in Singapore.

Research 

Augustine has made seminal contributions to the understanding of neurotransmitter release, showing that it is triggered by a remarkably local calcium signal.  He has been influential in discovering the role of several proteins involved in the release of neurotransmitters from nerve terminals. Augustine has played a key role in the use and spread of optogenetics, a tool for interrogating neural circuits in the brain. He has used the tool to investigate neural circuits involved in Parkinson's disease, Rett syndrome, and impulsive behaviour.

Selected publications

Books

Articles

References 

1955 births
American neuroscientists
Duke University faculty
Living people
Academic staff of Nanyang Technological University
Scientists from Baltimore
University of Maryland, Baltimore alumni